Rock 2.0, formerly Modern Rock, was a 24-hour music format produced by the Dial Global Radio Networks, and formerly distributed through its now-defunct Dial Global Local service. Its playlist is composed of highly tested classic rock from the 1980s combined with alternative and active rock music released from the 1990s to this day from artists such as Red Hot Chili Peppers, Nirvana, Nickelback, Pearl Jam, Metallica, etc. This satellite/internet-driven programming service predominantly targets male listeners in the 18–44 demographic range with a 20- to 40-year-old target. 

Rock 2.0 was originally an alternative rock format under its former owner Waitt Radio Networks called "Alternative Now!"  After Dial Global purchased Waitt in 2008, the service was renamed "Modern Rock," but retained its alternative/active rock hybrid format.  In mid-2010, the network was relaunched into what Dial Global terms as a new generation classic rock format as "Rock 2.0," featuring rock music from the 1980s through today.

On-Air Personalities: Pyke - Mornings, Eddie Barella - Middays, Mistress Carrie - Afternoons, Marconi - Nights...

When Dial Global made the final integration of the Dial Global Local formats into its own portfolio in June 2012, Rock 2.0 was the only Dial Global Local format to survive with its name intact.  It was the only format offered by Dial Global to feature current mainstream rock, and is available only in a Local version, not in a Total version.

In September 2013, Dial Global was renamed Westwood One, a brand that Dial Global had purchased in 2011, because the Westwood One brand is better known in the industry.

External links 
Rock 2.0 format page on Westwood One's website

References 

Radio formats
Defunct radio networks in the United States
Defunct radio stations in the United States